Anthephora pubescens, with the common names bottle brush grass and wool grass,  is a draught tolerant bunchgrass native to tropical and southern Africa.

Taxonomy
Synonyms and former names include: Anthephora abyssinica A. Rich., Anthephora cenchroides (Hochst.) K. Schum. ex Engl., Anthephora elegans Rupr. ex Steud., Anthephora hochstetteri Nees ex Hochst., Anthephora kotschyi Hochst., Hypudaeurus cenchroides Hochst. ex A. Braun)

Uses
This plant is cultivated especially for pasture rotation. In addition, it often makes a high quality hay, and it is also used forage source.

References

External links
FAO.org: Anthephora pubescens 
Tropical Forages: Anthephora pubescens

Panicoideae
Bunchgrasses of Africa
Flora of East Tropical Africa
Flora of Northeast Tropical Africa
Flora of South Tropical Africa
Flora of Southern Africa
Flora of West Tropical Africa
Flora of Namibia
Flora of South Africa
Forages